Onobrychis venosa, veined sainfoin is a perennial, spreading or suberect herb 10–25 cm high, with a short stem. Leaves alternate, compound, imparipinnate, leaflets ovoid to suborbicular 10-40  x 5–30 mm with characteristic bronze venation (hence venosa), hairy only along margins. Zygomorphic flowers with yellow petals with conspicuous dark-red nerves in axillary racemes. Flowers from February to May. The fruit is a circular flattened hairy pod.

Habitat
Habitat usually on dry hillsides on limestone but also on igneous formations or near the coast, from sea level to 950 m.

Distribution
Endemic to and common in many parts of Cyprus: Akamas, Panayia, Petra tou Romiou, Moni, Agios Therapon, Kosshi, Yeri, Latsia, Athalassa, Mitsero, Agrokipia, Klirou, Potami, Pendataktylos, Karpasia.

References

External links
 http://www.treknature.com/gallery/Middle_East/Cyprus/photo260000.htm
 http://www.ukwildflowers.com/Web_pages/onobrychis_venosa_cyprus_sainfoin.htm
 http://botany.cz/en/onobrychis-venosa/
 https://www.flickr.com/photos/texplorer/4434324853/
 http://www.agefotostock.com/en/Stock-Images/Rights-Managed/FHR-54463-00001-775
 http://www.stridvall.se/flowers/gallery/Fabaceae_2?page=23
 https://www.biolib.cz/en/taxon/id460553/
 http://www.theplantlist.org/tpl/record/kew-2389600
 http://www.panoramastock.com/info/iblflp01365303.html

Hedysareae
Endemic flora of Cyprus